Antonio DeVity (1901–1993, born Umberto Marone) was an Italian painter born in Naples. His life can be described in a few words: a big passion for painting and art and a great love for Paris, the city where his grandmother's family were originally from. He studied at the Liceo d'Arte in Naples and spent a few years in Paris, in a small attic room near Place Saint-Michel. In those years he had the opportunity to attend the “École des beaux arts”, and to appreciate those places that were often represented in his paintings, including Notre Dame, the Café de la Paix and the Moulin Rouge. During his time in Paris he first started using the pseudonym name "Antonio de Vity". This choice along with giving homage to his beloved Paris, contributed to creating an aura of mystery about the painter. After his return to Naples, Umberto founded a School which rapidly became a prestigious Art Studio, which constituted an important meeting place for artists from Southern Italy.

By the end of the 1950s the studio became one of the most important schools of art for Neapolitan painters, with more than 30 students. Starting in the late 1960s, the Art Studio was directed by Umberto's son Achille, who also continued to paint with the name of Antonio de Vity. The first exhibitions of Antonio de Vity dated back to the early 1950s: Brussels, Belgium 1953, Marrakech, Morocco 1955 and Madrid, Spain 1956. Many of the art exhibitions were held in France. He spent his later life in Naples, where his studio sold and exported works for many years. His works are said to have won international awards and his pieces are widely collected.

References 

1901 births
1993 deaths
20th-century Italian painters
Italian male painters
20th-century Italian male artists